The second unofficial Chess Olympiad was a team chess tournament held in Budapest from June 26 to July 15, 1926, during the third FIDE Congress. Six teams applied to contest the team tournament but Austria and Czechoslovakia withdrew before the start. Hungary won the tournament ahead of Yugoslavia, Romania and Germany.

Several individual tournaments which also featured international participation were held at the Congress. Ernst Grünfeld of Austria and Mario Monticelli of Italy won the strongest individual event, a sixteen-player round robin sometimes referred to as the first "FIDE Masters" tournament. Another sixteen players of mixed local and international backgrounds competed in a second round robin, won by Max Walter of Czechoslovakia. Edith Holloway of the UK won the women's tournament, and Sandor Zinner won an open tournament contested by the local Hungarians.

Results
The final results were as follows:

Team Tournament

{| class="wikitable sortable"
! # !! Team !! Players !! Points 
|-
| style="background:gold;"|1 ||  || E. Steiner, Vajda, Sterk, Négyesy, Bakonyi, S. Zinner  || 9
|-
| style="background:silver;"|2 ||  Kingdom of Serbs, Croats and Slovenes || Kostić, Asztalos, Ćirić, György || 8
|-
| style="background:#cc9966;"|3 ||  || Balogh, Bródy, Tyroler, Mendelssohn,  Proca || 5 
|-
| 4 ||  Germany|| Moritz, Schönmann, Machate, Rüster || 2
|}

First FIDE Masters

{| class="wikitable sortable"
! # !! Player !! Points !! Berger
|-
| style="background:gold;" rowspan="2"|1 ||  || 9½ || 68.00
|-
|   || 9½ || 65.25
|-
| style="background:#cc9966;" rowspan="3"|3 ||  || 9 || 67.00
|-
|   || 9 || 63.50
|-
|   || 9 || 63.25
|-
| 6 ||   || 8½ ||  
|-
| 7 ||   || 8 || 56.75 
|-
| 8 ||   || 8 || 54.50 
|-
| 9 ||   || 7½ || 59.25 
|-
| 10 ||   || 7½ || 56.75 
|-
| 11 ||   || 6½ ||  
|-
| 12 ||   || 6 || 44.00 
|-
| 13 ||   || 6 || 42.75 
|-
| 14 ||   || 6 || 41.75 
|-
| 15 ||   || 5½ ||  
|-
| 16 ||   || 4½ ||  
|}

Mixed tournament

Max Walter of Bratislava won this sixteen-player round robin with a score of 11½ out of 15. Balázs Sárközy of Budapest finished in second place with a score of 10½, and Anatoly Chepurnov of Vyborg scored 9½ to finish third.

Women's tournament

Eight women from London, Vienna and Budapest competed in a round robin. Edith Holloway of London won the tournament scoring 6½ out of 7, while Paula Wolf-Kalmar and Gisela Harum of Vienna both scored 5½ to tie for second and third places.

References

Unofficial 02
Olympiad Unofficial 02
Chess Olympiad Unofficial 02
Olympiad Unofficial 02
Women's chess competitions
Chess Olympiad Unofficial 02
1920s in Budapest
June 1926 sports events
July 1926 sports events